Kim Jae-hwa (born September 1, 1980) is a South Korean actress.

Career 
Kim made her acting debut in 2009 in the film Harmony and she started to gain recognition following her role as Deng Yaping, Chinese champion of table tennis competition in the 2012 series As One.

In 2018 she appeared in MBC's TV series Real Man 300.

Filmography

Film

Television series

Web series

Television show

Awards and nominations

References 

South Korean musical theatre actresses
Actresses from Seoul
South Korean film actresses
South Korean television actresses
1980 births
20th-century South Korean people
21st-century South Korean people
Living people